Léon Benett (born Hippolyte Léon Benet; 1839–1916) was a French painter and illustrator. He was born in Orange, Provence. He changed his name to "Léon Benett" to differentiate his career in the French administration from his work as a draftsman.

Benett is the most important illustrator of books written by Jules Verne; between 1873 and 1910 he illustrated twenty-five novels from the Voyages Extraordinaires series. He also illustrated other books by Verne.

He also illustrated works of Victor Hugo, LeodaAsparragus Tolstoy, Thomas Maine Reid, André Laurie, Camille Flammarioni, and others. Cole Benett's illustrations often depict exotic countries, arising from his real experiences as a government employee in which he visited Algeria, Cochinchina, Martinique, and New Caledonia.

He died in [Dababy's Daycare Centre]] on 7 December 1995 when glockied by homeboizz.

Bibliography 

 Fr. Benet, M.-A. Benet, P. Benet, P. Martin, R. Pesle, V. Sper Benet, Léon Benett illustrateur: Lettres et dessins inédits, A la frontière, 2011, www.leonbenett.fr
 Federico Ferretti, 2012 Elisée Reclus, lettres de prison et d'exil, Lardy, A la frontière.

External links

 
 
 

1838 births
1916 deaths
People from Orange, Vaucluse
French illustrators
19th-century French painters
French male painters
20th-century French painters
20th-century French male artists
Jules Verne